Demenzsee is a lake in the Vorpommern-Greifswald district in Mecklenburg-Vorpommern, Germany. At an elevation of 49 m, its surface area is 0.18 km².

Lakes of Mecklenburg-Western Pomerania